Maius or mensis Maius (May) was the third month of the ancient Roman calendar, following Aprilis (April) and preceding Iunius (June). On the oldest Roman calendar that had begun with March, it was the third of ten months in the year. May had 31 days.

The Romans considered May an infelicitous month. Although it began with one of the most notoriously licentious holidays of the Roman calendar, the Games of Flora (Ludi Florae), the middle of the month was devoted to propitiating the lemures, the restless shades of the dead.

Dates
The Romans did not number days of a month sequentially from the 1st through the last day. Instead, they counted back from the three fixed points of the month: the Nones (5th or 7th, depending on the length of the month), the Ides (13th or 15th), and the Kalends (1st) of the following month. Thus the last day of May was the pridie Kalendas Iunias, "day before the Kalends of June". Roman counting was inclusive; May 9 was ante diem VII Idūs Maias, "the 7th day before the Ides (15th) of May," usually abbreviated a.d. VII Id. Mai. (or with the a.d. omitted altogether); May 23 was X Kal. Iun., "the 10th day before the Kalends of June."

On the calendar of the Roman Republic and early Principate, each day was marked with a letter to denote its religiously lawful status. In May, these were:

 F for dies fasti, days when it was legal to initiate action in the courts of civil law;
 C, for dies comitalis, a day on which the Roman people could hold assemblies (comitia), elections, and certain kinds of judicial proceedings;
 N for dies nefasti, when these political activities and the administration of justice were prohibited;
 NP, the meaning of which remains elusive, but which marked feriae, public holidays;
 QRCF (perhaps for quando rex comitiavit fas<ref>On the basis of the Fasti Viae Lanza, which gives  Q. Rex C. F.</ref>), a day when it was religiously permissible for the rex (probably the priest known as the rex sacrorum) to call for an assembly.

By the late 2nd century AD, extant calendars no longer show days marked with these letters, probably in part as a result of calendar reforms undertaken by Marcus Aurelius. Days were also marked with nundinal letters in cycles of A B C D E F G H, to mark the "market week" (these are omitted in the table below).

On a dies religiosus, individuals were not to undertake any new activity, nor do anything other than tend to the most basic necessities. A dies natalis was an anniversary such as a temple founding or rededication, sometimes thought of as the "birthday" of a deity. During the Imperial period, the birthdays and anniversaries of the emperor and his family gained prominence as Roman holidays. After the mid-1st century AD, a number of dates are added to calendars for spectacles and games (ludi) held in honor of various deities in the venue called a "circus" (ludi circenses). After the time of Constantine, the first emperor to convert to Christianity, sacrifices were omitted from the ludi. In the mid-4th century, games celebrating the victories of the Constantinian dynasty were held May 4–9 (the Ludi Maximati) and May 13–17 (Ludi Persici).

Festivals marked in large letters on extant fasti, represented by festival names in all capital letters on the table, are thought to have been the most ancient holidays, becoming part of the calendar before 509 BC. The Ambarvalia, a "moveable feast" (feriae conceptivae) involving the lustration of the fields, seems to have been held in May, with May 29 commonly the date on which it fell.

Unless otherwise noted, the dating and observances on the following table are from H. H. Scullard, Festivals and Ceremonies of the Roman Republic'' (Cornell University Press, 1981), pp. 116–125.

See also
 Floréal
 Rosalia, a rose festival celebrated during the Imperial period at varying times mainly in May

References

May
Months of the Roman calendar